Suta punctata, also known as the spotted snake or little spotted snake, is a species of venomous snake that is endemic to Australia. The specific epithet punctata ("spotted") refers to the body markings.

Description
Colouration is reddish-brown on the upper body, with a pale belly and black markings on head and neck. It grows to an average of about 40 cm in length.

Behaviour
The species is viviparous, with an average litter size of four.

Distribution and habitat
The species occurs in the Pilbara and Kimberley regions of Western Australia, in the Northern Territory from the Top End to as far south as Alice Springs, and in north-western Queensland. The type locality is Port Walcott in the Pilbara.

References

 
punctata
Snakes of Australia
Endemic fauna of Australia
Reptiles of the Northern Territory
Reptiles of Queensland
Reptiles of Western Australia
Taxa named by George Albert Boulenger
Reptiles described in 1896